Diplotaxis antoniensis is a species of flowering plants of the family Brassicaceae. The species is endemic to Cape Verde. It is listed as a vulnerable plant by the IUCN.

Distribution and ecology
Diplotaxis antoniensis is restricted to the island of Santo Antão. It occurs between 1,100 and 1,500 metres elevation in arid, semi-arid and sub-humid zones. It is found on mountain slopes, in stony plains and in cultivated fields, where it is considered as a weed.

References

antoniensis
Endemic flora of Cape Verde
Flora of Santo Antão, Cape Verde